is a railway station on the Tobu Tojo Line in Itabashi, Tokyo, Japan, operated by the private railway operator Tobu Railway.

Lines
Only "Local" (all-stations) services stop at this station, with eight trains per hour in each direction during the daytime.

Station layout
The station consists of two side platforms serving two tracks. The station has two entrances: the north entrance adjoining platform 2 (for Ikebukuro) and the south entrance adjoining platform 1 (for Narimasu). The two platforms are also linked by an underpass.

Platforms

Facilities
Passenger toilet facilities are provided on platform 1.

History

The station opened on 29 December 1930.

From 17 March 2012, station numbering was introduced on the Tobu Tojo Line, with Shimo-Akatsuka Station becoming "TJ-09".

Passenger statistics
In fiscal 2010, the station was used by an average of 18,457 passengers daily.

Surrounding area
 Chikatetsu-Akatsuka Station ( Tokyo Metro Yūrakuchō Line/ Tokyo Metro Fukutoshin Line)
 Hikarigaoka Park
 Akatsuka Park
 Itabashi Art Museum
  National Route 254

See also
 List of railway stations in Japan

References

External links

 Tobu station information 

Tobu Tojo Main Line
Stations of Tobu Railway
Railway stations in Tokyo
Railway stations in Japan opened in 1930